Mike Kowall (born September 10, 1951) is a former Republican member of the Michigan Senate, representing the 15th district from 2011 until 2018. He served in the Michigan House of Representatives from 1998 to 2002.

Kowall's wife, Eileen, serves in the Michigan House of Representatives, making them the first married couple to serve in the Legislature at the same time in 25 years (John Engler and Colleen House were the last).

Electoral history

References

Republican Party Michigan state senators
1951 births
Living people
Republican Party members of the Michigan House of Representatives
People from Oakland County, Michigan
20th-century American politicians
21st-century American politicians